Ornipholidotos henrii is a butterfly in the family Lycaenidae. It is found in Cameroon and the Republic of the Congo. The habitat consists of forests.

References

Butterflies described in 2000
Taxa named by Michel Libert
Ornipholidotos